Neoduma ectozona is a moth of the subfamily Arctiinae. It was described by George Hampson in 1918. It is found on Luzon in the Philippines and on Borneo. The habitat consists of dipterocarp forests, swamps, secondary and coastal forests.

References

 

Lithosiini
Moths described in 1918